Benjamin Clifton (born 1774) was an English amateur cricketer who made eight known appearances in first-class cricket matches in 1798.

Clifton was mainly associated with Marylebone Cricket Club but also represented All-England and the Montpelier Cricket Club.

References

1774 births
English cricketers
English cricketers of 1787 to 1825
Marylebone Cricket Club cricketers
Year of death unknown